Two ships of the Royal Navy have been named HMS Alyssum:

  was an  launched in 1915 and sunk in 1917
  was a  launched in 1941 and transferred to the Free French Naval Forces on completion. She was sunk in 1942
 

Royal Navy ship names